The Beach Will Never Die is the third album released by surf music band The Surfin' Lungs, released in 1990 on the Swiss label Lux-Noise. This was the first album by the new-look Lungs, with keyboardist/guitarist/vocalist Clive Gilling and drummer Graeme Block in the ranks and marked a change in style, with Gilling's organ playing a prominent role in proceedings, while the production had a much crisper feel to it. Of the 13 tracks, 11 were written by the group, while one, "Oh Oh I Love Her So" was a cover of a song by The Ramones, which featured a different arrangement, while the other, "Anywhere The Girls Are", stayed true to the original effort by The Fantastic Baggys.

Track listing

Personnel
 Chris Pearce – vocals, guitar
 Steve Dean – vocals, bass, acoustic guitar
 Clive Gilling – vocals, guitar, keyboards, organ
 Graeme Block – drums, percussion

Producer
 The Surfin' Lungs, along with Chris Broderick, Mark Hawkins and Mark Hunt

Trivia
 Although future drummer Ray Webb appears on the album cover, he does not actually play on any of the tracks as Graeme Block was unavailable at the time to do the photo shoot, which was taken at Studland Bay, in Dorset.
 Graeme Block – who was another band member who did not provide vocals – had originally been in Steve Dean's brother's band called What The Curtains and they were extras in the movie Masters of the Universe after they had gone to Los Angeles to make it in the music business to no avail.
 Recorded in 1988, "Let 'Em Eat Surf" was the first track that Clive Gilling played on as an official member of the group.
 Some of the album was nearly produced by legendary surf/hot rod musician Gary Usher who had been impressed by the group's earlier release, Cowabunga and approached them to cut a few tracks, but nothing materialised.

1990 albums
The Surfin' Lungs albums